Julia Wertz (born December 29, 1982) is an American cartoonist, writer and urban explorer.

Cartooning career
Wertz was born in the San Francisco Bay Area. She made her name with a comic strip titled The Fart Party, which Atomic Books anthologized in two volumes in 2007 and 2009. Soon after the strip's success, she retired The Fart Party, claiming she was unaware of its impending significance at the time of its creation. Wertz subsequently moved her online operations to the Museum of Mistakes site, where a few old Fart Party strips exist in the archive.

In 2010, Random House published Drinking at the Movies, Wertz's first full-length graphic memoir. Against the backdrop of her move from San Francisco to New York, the book details serious issues, such as a family member's battle with substance abuse and her own alcoholism, with trademark wit and self-effacement. The Los Angeles Times called Drinking at the Movies a "quiet triumph" and critic Rob Clough, in The Comics Journal, said Wertz had "brilliant old-school comic strip timing." Drinking at the Movies was nominated for a 2011 Eisner Award in the Best Humor Publication category.

In September 2012, Koyama Press published The Infinite Wait and Other Stories, a collection of Wertz's short comic stories, which was nominated for an Eisner Award in the Best Reality Based Work category. In 2014, Atomic Books released Museum of Mistakes: The Fart Party Collection, which anthologized Wertz's early books, plus new and extra material. Her books have been translated into many languages.

From 2010 to 2012, Wertz was part of Pizza Island, a Greenpoint studio consisting of cartoonists Sarah Glidden, Lisa Hanawalt, Domitille Collardey, Karen Sneider, Kate Beaton and Meredith Gran.

In 2015, Wertz started a monthly comics series for The New Yorker, about lesser-known historical events and facts about New York City, which appear online and in print. as well as a monthly illustration series of cityscapes for Harper's Magazine. Those pieces were eventually expanded to make the book Tenements, Towers & Trash: An Unconventional Illustrated History of New York City, published by Black Dog & Leventhal/Hachette in 2017, for which Wertz won the 2018 Brendan Gill Prize

After spending a decade in New York City, Wertz moved back to Northern California where she lives with her partner Oliver, and their son Felix. She also runs Adventure Bible School, a blog about urban exploring.

Books 
 The Fart Party, vol. 1, Atomic Books, 2007
 The Fart Party, vol. 2, Atomic Books, 2009
 Drinking at the Movies, Random House, 2010
 translated as  Entre Umas E Outras, Nemo, 2016.
 translated as Drinking at the Movies: Un anno a New York, Eris Edizioni, 2017.
 translated as Whiskey & New York, L'Agrume, 2016
 The Infinite Wait, Koyama Press, 2012
 translated as L'attente infinie, L'Agrume, 2015.
 translated as The Infinite Wait, Eris Edizioni, 2018.
 Museum of Mistakes: The Fart Party Collection, Uncivilized Press, 2023
 translated as Le Musée de Mes Erreurs, L'Agrume 2023
 Tenements, Towers & Trash: An Unconventional Illustrated History of New York City, Black Dog & Leventhal, 2017
 translated as Les Entrailles de New York, L'Agrume 2018
 translated as Barrios, Bloques y Basura Errata Naturae Editores 2018

References

External links
 Adventure Bible School

Alternative cartoonists
American women cartoonists
American female comics artists
American comics writers
Female comics writers
Living people
1982 births
People from Napa, California
People from the San Francisco Bay Area
The New Yorker people
American cartoonists
21st-century American women